Cherry is a mining ghost town in central Yavapai County, Arizona, United States, between Dewey and Camp Verde, located at an elevation of 5143 feet.

History 

Cherry's post office was established March 3, 1884 and discontinued March 15, 1943. Notable mines in the area include the Federal, Bunker, Sunnybrook, Logan and Gold Bullion mines. About 400 people lived and worked in Cherry during its prime. At present, Cherry is a small retirement and vacation-home community. A number of the original buildings are still in use. The Cherry cemetery has several graves from the late 19th and early 20th centuries.

References

External links
 
 
 Cherry – Ghost Town of the Month at azghosttowns.com
 Cherry ghost town, photos
 Cherry photo gallery
 Cherry USGS topographic map, at TopoQuest
 The Story of Cherry, Arizona on Cherry Fire website

1884 establishments in Arizona Territory
Former populated places in Yavapai County, Arizona
Ghost towns in Arizona
Cemeteries in Arizona
Mining communities in Arizona